Jeanette Jo Epps (born November 3, 1970) is an American aerospace engineer and NASA astronaut. Epps received both her M. S. and Ph.D degrees in aerospace engineering from the University of Maryland, where she was part of the rotor-craft research group and was a NASA GSRP Fellow. She was chosen for the 20th class of NASA astronauts in 2009, graduating in 2011. Epps currently serves as a member of the ISS Operations Branch and has completed analog astronaut missions, including NEEMO 18 and CAVES 19. She is the second woman and first African-American woman to have participated in CAVES.

Early life and education 
Jeanette Epps was born in Syracuse, New York, one of seven children born to Henry and Luberta ( Jackson) Epps, Mississippians who moved to Syracuse as part of the Great Migration. She and her twin sister Janet excelled in math and science. She graduated from Corcoran High School in Syracuse and earned a B.S. degree from Le Moyne College and an M.S. and a Ph.D degree in aerospace engineering from the University of Maryland.

Early research and career 
While pursuing her M.S. and Ph.D at the University of Maryland, Epps was awarded a NASA GRSP Fellowship and went on to publish many academic works which have been highly cited. Her research was focused in the area of materials engineering, which included comprehensive testing of composite swept-tip beams, comparison of analytical models with experimental results for shape memory alloys, and use of shape memory alloy actuators for tracking helicopter rotor blades in-flight.

After graduating, Epps worked in research at Ford Motor Company, then as a Technical Intelligence Officer with the Central Intelligence Agency. Her work at the Ford Motor Company, resulted in a provisional patent involving the application of magnetostrictive actuators to reduce vibrations in the suspension control arms, and later, a US patent for detection of the location of a frontal collision in an automobile. She worked at the CIA for seven years, including deployments to Iraq.

NASA career 
In June 2009, Epps was selected as an astronaut candidate for the 20th class of NASA astronauts and later qualified in 2011. Her training included extensive Russian, spacewalk (EVA) and robotics training, along with geology. She has also completed T-38 jet training and has attended the National Outdoor Leadership School (NOLS).

Epps subsequently served as an aquanaut aboard the Aquarius underwater laboratory during the NEEMO 18 undersea exploration mission for nine days starting July 21, 2014. She has also participated in geologic studies in Hawaii. Epps has worked with the Generic Joint Operation Panel as a representative, which included work on crew efficiency on the ISS. This work resulted in the Johnson Space Center Director's Innovation Group Achievement Award in 2013. She has also worked as CAPCOM for Mission Control, including serving as lead CAPCOM, and currently serves in ISS Operations Branch. Epps has also completed training in winter and water survival in Star City, Russia.

On January 4, 2017, NASA announced that Epps would be assigned as a flight engineer to the International Space Station in mid-2018 for Expeditions 56 and 57, becoming the first African American space station crew member, the first African American to launch aboard the Russian Soyuz vehicle, and the 15th African American to fly in space, but on January 16, 2018, NASA announced that Epps had been replaced by her backup Serena M. Auñón-Chancellor, but that Epps would "be considered for assignment to future missions". The reason for Epps' removal was not stated, and a NASA spokesperson said, "These decisions are personnel matters for which NASA doesn't provide information." The Washington Post stated that "Last-minute crew changes are not unusual at NASA."

In 2019, Epps completed the ESA CAVES training program simulating the demands of exploring unknown terrains, such as to be expected on the Moon and Mars. Epps is the second woman to participate in CAVES, following fellow NASA astronaut, Jessica Meir.

Epps also participates in public speaking and she has been a guest speaker at the University of Maryland multiple times. In 2013, she gave the commencement speech for the A. James Clark School of Engineering's Winter Commencement Ceremony.

She is currently a Member of the Society for Science & the Public, in addition to the AIAA.

On August 25, 2020, NASA announced that Epps would join the first operational mission of Boeing's CST-100 Starliner to the International Space Station. According to The New York Times, Epps "would be the first Black woman to be part of an I.S.S. crew." African-American astronauts were members of space-shuttle crews during ISS construction, until Victor Glover none had become a crew member making an extended stay. 

NASA astronaut Jeanette Epps continues to prepare for an upcoming long duration mission aboard Starliner-1. NASA also has identified backup flight opportunities for Epps on the SpaceX Crew Dragon spacecraft for additional scheduling and resource flexibility. Epps has begun cross-training on the SpaceX Crew Dragon spacecraft to prepare for this possibility.

Awards and honors 

 1996, 1997, 1998, 1999 NASA GSRP Fellowship
 2003, 2004, 2008 Exceptional Performance Award
 2012 Academy of Distinguished Alumni, University of Maryland
 2013 Johnson Space Center Director’s Innovation Group Achievement Award
 2014 Glenn L. Martin Medal, A. James Clark School of Engineering, University of Maryland

Honorary Doctorates 

 2016 Doctorate of Humane Letters, LeMoyne College, New York

Selected publications
Epps has authored several highly referenced works, including conference and journal papers from her graduate research, along with a patent from her work at the Ford Motor Company.

 Epps, J. and Chopra, I., “Methodology for In-flight Tracking of Helicopter Rotor Blades Using Shape Memory Alloy Actuators, Journal of the American Helicopter Society, Vol. 49, No. 2, April 2004, pp. 192-200.
 Epps, J. J., and Chandra, R., "Shape Memory Alloy Actuation for Active Tuning of Composite Beams," Smart Materials and Structures Journal, 6 (1997), p. 251-256.
 Epps, J. J., and Chandra, R., "The Natural Frequencies of Rotating Composite Beams with Tip Sweep," Journal of the American Helicopter Society, Vol. 41, No. 1, January 1996, pp. 29–36.

See also 
List of astronauts by name
List of astronauts by year of selection
List of black astronauts
List of female astronauts

References

External links

Astronaut Bio: Jeanette J. Epps
Spacefacts biography of Jeanette J. Epps

1970 births
Living people
African-American engineers
African-American scientists
American scientists
American astronauts
Women astronauts
American aerospace engineers
People of the Central Intelligence Agency
Le Moyne College alumni
University of Maryland, College Park alumni
People from Syracuse, New York
American women scientists
Aquanauts
Engineers from New York (state)
21st-century African-American people
21st-century African-American women
20th-century African-American people
20th-century African-American women